Mostafa Ahmed ali is a paralympic athlete from Egypt competing mainly in category F37 shot put and discus events.

Athletics

Paralympics 
Mostafa competed in the 2004 Summer Paralympics in Athens finishing fifth in the shot put and winning the bronze medal in the F37 discus.

References

Paralympic athletes of Egypt
Athletes (track and field) at the 2004 Summer Paralympics
Paralympic bronze medalists for Egypt
Living people
Medalists at the 2004 Summer Paralympics
Year of birth missing (living people)
Paralympic medalists in athletics (track and field)
Egyptian male discus throwers
Egyptian male shot putters